Jalalpur Chattha, Punjab, Pakistan is also transliterated as JALĀLPUR CHATHA and in Urdu as ( جلال پور چٹھہ ). Jalalpur Chattha is the registered name of a village in Tehsile Wazirabad, District Gujranwala. This village is also known as Chuattiyan ( چواتیاں ). It is the last village of District Gujranwala at the south. It is a populous village, having a population of almost 6000-8000 persons. The nearby villages are Sooianwala Chattha, Madrassa Chattha and Kot Hara. 

The main caste of this village is Chattha (مطیع الحسن چٹھہ). Other castes are also present, such as Rana and Hanjra. There are also members of Christian Community in this village.

Villages in Gujranwala District